Jhansi Junction railway station (station code: VGLB), officially known as  Virangana Lakshmibai Jhansi Junction railway station,  is a major railway junction in the city of Jhansi in Bundelkhand region of Uttar Pradesh. It is one of the busiest and largest railway stations in India. It hosts various trains of Indian Railways like the Gatimaan Express, which is the fastest train of India, as well as others like Bundelkhand Express. It is a major halt for various important trains of Indian Railways like  five sets of Rajdhani Express bound for Mumbai, Chennai, Bengaluru, Hyderabad etc. One set of Bhopal Shatabdi Express, three Duronto Express trains, Punjab Mail one of the oldest running trains in India, Kerala Express, Karnataka Express, etc.

It is a major intercity hub and a technical as well as commercial stoppage for all trains passing through Jhansi.

History

The railway station was built by the British in the late 1880s. After a long survey of three places the current site was selected for the station. The station has a massive fort-like building painted in maroon and off-white.

During ancient times, Jhansi was a stronghold of the Chandela Rajput kings and was known as Balwant Nagar. However, it lost importance in the 11th century after the decline of the Chandela dynasty. It rose in prominence in the 17th century when Raja Bir Singh Deo of Orchha State constructed the Jhansi Fort in 1613.

The station had three platforms in the beginning. It could easily handle two trains at a time (Same are the cases with platforms two and three).

The station was the focal point for The Indian Midland Railways Company which laid down lines radially in all directions from Jhansi, and managed the large workshop at Jhansi.

The first Shatabdi Express of India started between New Delhi and Jhansi.

The fastest train of India Gatimaan Express runs between New Delhi and Jhansi. It is a high-priority train used by tourists and businessmen. Covering journey in 4 hours 10 minutes.

Earlier Jhansi used to be a part of Central railways zone headquartered at Mumbai but now comes under North Central Railway Zone headquartered at Allahabad.

On 1 January 2022, the train station was renamed from Jhansi Junction to Virangana Lakshmibai Railway Station in memory of Rani Lakshmibai, the former Queen, or Rani, of Jhansi who fought against the British.  This change also changed the station code from JHS to VGLB, and the numerical code to 13309727. There is a social media campaign against the new name, and people have complained about the name to the MP for Jhansi, Anurag Sharma saying that "Jhansi" should be part of the station's name.

Connectivity

Jhansi Junction Railway Station is linked with many industrial and important cities of India by direct trains like New Delhi, Allahabad, Mumbai, Bangalore, Kolkata, Sagar, Lucknow, Etawah, Varanasi, Jabalpur, Pune, Hyderabad, Bhubaneswar, Kanpur, Vasco da gama, Vijayawada, Visakhapatnam, Udaipur, Amritsar, Pathankot, Lucknow, Bhopal, Chennai, Gorakhpur, Coimbatore, Jammu, Agra, Amaravati, Raipur, Ahmedabad, Banda, Nagpur, Thiruvananthapuram, Kochi, Kozhikode etc.

Jhansi Junction Railway Station is served by 4 broad gauge routes:
 Delhi–Mumbai
 Delhi–Dr. M.G.R. Chennai Central
 Jhansi–Kanpur Central
 Nagpur–Bhopal
 Prayagraj–Manikpur

There is an ongoing survey for a new line between Jhansi Junction Railway Station and Shivpuri in Madhya Pradesh which would be further connected to Sawai Madhopur and Jaipur.

Many Indian Railways trains pass through Jhansi, including the Gatimaan Express (currently the fastest train in India).

 Gatimaan Express (origins from Jhansi),
 Shatabdi Express
 Rajdhani Expresses
 Taj Express (origins from Jhansi),
 Andhra Pradesh Express
 Karnataka Express
 Tamil Nadu Express
 Kerala Express
 Telangana Express
 Bhopal Express
 Dakshin Express
 Pushpak Express
 Bundelkhand Express
 Goa Express
 Duronto Express
Jhansi is an important destination for tourists intending to go to Khajuraho, a UNESCO World Heritage Site and Orchha.

Facilities
Jhansi Junction Railway Station has 8 platforms, four broad over-bridges. Due to heavy usage, two new platforms are planned, increasing the total to 11.
Six pairs of the Rajdhani Express as well as the Bhopal–New Delhi Shatabdi Express pass through Jhansi. Three pairs of Duronto Express also have their stoppages at Jhansi. All state Sampark Krantis passing through Jhansi have official stops at Jhansi. In all more than 150 trains stop at Virangana Lakshmibai Railway Station every day.
Free Internet connectivity and wifi station by RailWire for the first half an hour.
The station also features a La-festa restaurant.
Executive Class & Class II air-conditioned and non-air-conditioned waiting rooms facility available.
A Cyber cafe, and tourist information offices of both the Madhya Pradesh and Uttar Pradesh governments.
Clock room booking of reservation and non reserved tickets platform tickets available.
A new shopping mall under construction just in front of railway station

Trains boarding from Jhansi Junction Railway Station
 12050/12049 Jhansi–Nizamuddin Gatimaan Express
 12279/12280 Jhansi–New Delhi Taj Express.
 11109/11110 Jhansi–Lucknow Intercity Express
 11103/11104 Jhansi–Bandra Terminus Express (via Gwalior, Ujjain, Ratlam, Surat
 11105/11106 Jhansi Kolkata Pratham Swatrantata Sangram Express (via Kanpur, Patna)
11801/11802 Jhansi–Etawah Link Express
51815/51816 Jhansi–Agra Fort Passenger
51831/51832 Jhansi–Agra Cantt Passenger
51803/51804 Jhansi–Kanpur Central Passenger
54157/54158 Jhansi–Kanpur Central Passenger
51813/51814 Jhansi–Lucknow Charbagh Passenger
51807/51808 Jhansi–Banda Passenger
54159/54160 Jhansi–Banda Passenger
51805/51806 Jhansi–Manikpur Passenger
51819/51820 Jhansi–Allahabad Jn Passenger
51817/51818 Jhansi–Tikamgarh Passenger
51821/51822 Jhansi–Khajuraho Passenger
51811/51812 Jhansi–Bina Passenger
51827/51828 Jhansi–Itarsi Nagpur Passenger
and several other passengers and shuttles trains connecting Lucknow, Kanpur, Agra Cantt, Allahabad, Manikpur, Banda Jn, Khajuraho, Tikamgarh, Bhopal, Bina and Itarsi.

Loco sheds
Jhansi has both the Electric & Diesel loco sheds. Its has many electric and diesel locos together.

 Electric Loco Shed, Jhansi has sanctioned capacity of 150 locos. It is holding total number of 215 locomotive, 33 WAP 4, 117 WAG 5 & 65 WAG 7 class locomotives.

 Diesel Loco Shed, Jhansi holds most of Alco & EMD class locomotives.

See also
 Bhowani Junction

References

Railway stations in Jhansi district
Transport in Jhansi
Jhansi railway division
Buildings and structures in Jhansi